Scharff is a surname, and may refer to:

 Alexander Scharff (1904 - 1985), German historian
 Anton Scharff (1845, Vienna - 1903, Brunn am Gebirge), Austrian medal maker
 Benjamin Scharff (1651 - 1702), German doctor
 Edwin Scharff (1887, Neu-Ulm - 1955, Hamburg), German sculptor and painter
 Edwin-Scharff-Preis
 Gertrude Goldhaber, née Scharff (also: Gertrude Scharff-Goldhaber; 1911, Mannheim - 1998), German-US physicist, wife of Maurice Goldhaber
 Gottfried Scharff (1782 - 1855), German merchant and politician
 Gottfried Balthasar Scharff (1676 - 1744), German Lutheran theologian and writer
 Hanns(-Joachim Gottlob) Scharff (1907 - 1992), German interrogator
 Harald Scharff (1836 - 1912), Danish ballet dancer
 Johannes Scharff (1595 - 1660), German Lutheran theologian and philosopher
 Margi Scharff (1955, Memphis, Tennessee - 2007, Tiburon, California), American artist
 Peter Scharff (born 1957), chemist
 Robert Francis Scharff, (1858 -1934), British zoologist
 Samantha Scharff, an American television producer and comedy writer
 Scott Scharff (born 1982, Wisconsin Rapids, Wisconsin), American football player
 Thomas Scharff (disambiguation)
 Thomas Scharff (born 1963, Uelzen), German Medieval historian
 Thomas Scharff (born 1970), German actor
 Werner Scharff (1905 - 1945), German resistant
 Paul Scharff (born 1970, Melrose Park, Illinois), Author Murder In McHenry
 Gilbert Woodrow Scharffs (born 1930), an American Latter-day Saint religious educator and author

See also 
 Scharf
 Scharpf, Scharpff
 Sharp
 Sharpe

German-language surnames